The mashak (also known as , , , , , , ,) is a type of bagpipe found in Northern India, Uttarakhand, Sudurpaschim Province (especially Baitadi and Darchula district) of Nepal and parts of Pakistan and Afghanistan. The pipe was associated with weddings and festive occasions. In India it is historically found in Garhwal (kumaon) in Uttarakhand, Rajasthan and Uttar Pradesh. This bagpipe uses single reeds, and can be played either as a drone or as a melody instrument.

Etymology
The etymology of the term mashak stems from its common use in India, referring to a skin bag used for carrying water. This skin bag shares a similar function to the air bag of the bag pipes.

Relation with the Scottish Highland pipes

Some academics dispute any indigenous origins of the mashak; researcher Ander Burton Alter wrote in 2000 that the pipes today played in Kumaon are Scottish Highland bagpipes with one bass and two tenor drones, with no local manufacturer or evidence of existence prior to British rule in 1814.  Organologist Anthony Baines, however, described an intermediary development stage wherein Indian musicians imitated the Highland pipe by tying "an extra pipe or two" into their mashak. Similarly, the New Grove Dictionary of Musical Instruments (1984) describes the traditional mashak as becoming rare as it is displaced by the Scottish pipes.

Garhwali bagpipes 
The Garhwali bagpipe is the name to which the Garhwali people of Northern India have given the masak baja.

Cultural significance 
In the central Himalayan region of Garhwal in Northern India the masak baja is an important part of rural wedding ceremonies. The masak baja is played to process with the groom's on their way to and from the bride's village. The masak is accompanied by two pipers and drummers. The masak and its accompanying instruments send a clear message across the audible area that a wedding is taking place.

Discography
Various Artists – Footprints In The Desert... track Rajasthan's Bagpipe (Mashak). De Kulture
Various – Music From The Shrines Of Ajmer and Mundra track Populat Naubat Shahna'i. Topic Records (UK), 1995

See also

Titti (bagpipe), a Telugu bagpipe of Andhra Pradesh
Sruti upanga, a drone bagpipe of Tamil Nadu

References

Bagpipes
Indian musical instruments
Culture of Uttarakhand
Folk music instruments
Rajasthani music